Zoya Pukhova (1936-2016) was a Soviet-Russian Politician (Communist).

She was a member of the Presidium of the Supreme Soviet, making her a member of the Collective Head of State, in 1966-1989.

References

1936 births
20th-century Russian women politicians
20th-century Russian politicians
Russian communists
Soviet women in politics
Presidium of the Supreme Soviet